Shanghai Circuit is a station on Line 11 of the Shanghai Metro. It opened on March 29, 2010. The station is named after the nearby Shanghai International Circuit. This is the only open-cut station on line 11.

References 
 ,

Railway stations in Shanghai
Line 11, Shanghai Metro
Shanghai Metro stations in Jiading District
Railway stations in China opened in 2009